"God Defend New Zealand" (meaning 'New Zealand') is one of two national anthems of New Zealand, the other being "God Save the King". Legally the two have equal status, but "God Defend New Zealand" is more commonly used. Originally written as a poem, it was set to music as part of a competition in 1876. Over the years its popularity increased, and it was eventually named the second national anthem in 1977. It has English and Māori lyrics, with slightly different meanings. Since the late 1990s, the usual practice when performed in public is to perform the first verse of the national anthem twice, first in Māori and then in English.

History and performance

"God Defend New Zealand" was written as a poem in the 1870s by Irish-born, Victorian-raised immigrant Thomas Bracken of Dunedin. A competition to compose music for the poem was held in 1876 by The Saturday Advertiser and judged by three prominent Melbourne musicians, with a prize of ten guineas. The winner of the competition was the Vandemonian-born John Joseph Woods of Lawrence, Otago, who composed the melody in a single sitting the evening after finding out about the competition. The song was first performed at the Queen's Theatre, Princes Street in Dunedin, on Christmas Day, 1876. In February 1878, sheet music was published.

A Māori version of the song was produced in 1878 by Thomas Henry Smith of Auckland, a judge in the Native Land Court, on request of Premier George Edward Grey. A copy of the Māori lyrics, using Aotearoa for its title, was printed in Otago newspapers in October 1878. In Smith's original text the word "whakarangona" was used to translate 'hear', rather than the modern "whakarongona".

In 1897, Premier Richard Seddon presented a copy of words and music to Queen Victoria. The song became increasingly popular during the early 20th century, and in 1940 the New Zealand government bought the copyright and made it New Zealand's 'national hymn' in time for that year's centennial celebrations. It was used at the British Empire Games from 1950 onwards, and first used at the Olympics during the 1972 Summer Olympics in Munich. Following the performance at the Munich games, a campaign began to have the song adopted as the national anthem.

"God Save the Queen" was New Zealand's sole national anthem until the 1970s. In May 1973 a remit to change the New Zealand flag, declare a New Zealand republic and change the national anthem was voted down by the Labour Party at their national conference. In 1976 Garth Henry Latta from Dunedin presented a petition to Parliament asking "God Defend New Zealand" to be made the national anthem. With the consent of Queen Elizabeth II, the government of Robert Muldoon gazetted the song as the country's second national anthem on 21 November 1977, on equal standing with "God Save the Queen".

An alternative official arrangement for massed singing by Maxwell Fernie was announced by the Minister of Internal Affairs, Allan Highet on 31 May 1979. Woods' original score was written in the key of A-flat major (concert pitch) and was better suited for solo and choral singing; Fernie's arrangement changed the key down a semitone to G major.

Until the 1990s, only the first verse of the English version was commonly sung. The first public singing of the anthem in both Maori and English was by singers Vicky Lee and Cyndi Joe at the Kiwis-Britain league test in 1992. A public debate emerged after only the first Māori verse was sung by Hinewehi Mohi at the 1999 Rugby World Cup match between the All Blacks and England, and it then became conventional to sing both the Māori and English first verses one after the other.

The New Zealand Expo 88 Song
In 1987 Alan Slater produced a new arrangement of the song, having been commissioned to do so by the Department of Internal Affairs, which was used for Expo 88 in Brisbane. It was titled The New Zealand Expo Song and consisted of the first verse in Māori sung by Annie Crummer, the second verse in English sung by Peter Morgan, the fourth verse in Māori sung by Dalvanius Prime and the Pātea Māori Club, the fifth verse in English sung by Crummer and Morgan, and finally the first verse in English sung by everybody. The singers were backed by the NZ Youth Jazz Orchestra. The third verse was omitted. This version was played, accompanied by a video montage of New Zealand scenes, animals, plants etc, as TVNZ's transmission opening from the second quarter of 1988 right through to 1995.

Protocol
The Ministry for Culture and Heritage has responsibility for the national anthems. The guidelines in the 1977 Gazette notice for choosing which anthem should be used on any occasion advise that the royal anthem would be appropriate at any occasion where the monarch, a member of the royal family or the governor-general is officially present, or when loyalty to the Crown is to be stressed; while "God Defend New Zealand" would be appropriate whenever the national identity of New Zealand is to be stressed, even in association with a toast to the reigning head of state. There are no regulations governing the performance of "God Defend New Zealand", leaving citizens to exercise their best judgment. When it is performed at an event, etiquette is for the audience to stand during the performance.

Copyright
Copyright on the English lyrics for "God Defend New Zealand" expired from the end of the year that was 50 years after the death of the author (Bracken), that is, from 1 January 1949. The rights to the musical score passed into the public domain in the 1980s.

Lyrics
The anthem has five verses, each in English and Māori. The Māori version is not a direct translation of the English version.

The underlying structure of the piece is a prayer or invocation to God, with the refrain "God defend New Zealand" (in English).

Meaning of "Pacific's triple star"

There is some discussion, with no official explanation, of the meaning of "Pacific's triple star". Unofficial explanations range from New Zealand's three biggest islands (North, South, and Stewart Island), to the three stars on the flag of Te Kooti (a Māori political and religious leader of the 19th century).

Note on whakarangona

The original 1878 Māori version uses whakarangona (to be heard), the passive form of the verb whakarongo (to hear). An alternate form of the verb, whakarongona, first appeared as one of several errors in the Māori version when God Defend New Zealand was published as the national hymn in 1940. The latter form has appeared in many versions of the anthem since this time, although the Ministry of Culture and Heritage continues to use whakarangona.

Criticism
Both the lyrics and melody of "God Defend New Zealand" have been criticised in some quarters as being dull and irrelevant. Many of the words and concepts have been perceived as antiquated or obscure: for example, "thy", "thee", "ramparts", "assail" and "nations' van". It was perceived as being difficult to sing at the original pitch. However, no widely acceptable replacement has been found, and it has not faced major opposition.

Notes

References

External links

The story of "God Defend New Zealand" by Tui Kowhai c.1939

National anthems, New Zealand Ministry for Culture and Heritage
"God Defend New Zealand" – Audio of the national anthem of New Zealand, with information and lyrics
Page about the national anthem  includes a recording by the New Zealand Symphony Orchestra

National Anthem performed in sign language, 3 News, 5 May 2011

1876 songs
Oceanian anthems
National symbols of New Zealand
New Zealand patriotic songs
National anthems
Songs about Oceania
National anthem compositions in G major
Songs based on poems
Māori-language songs